is a 2014 Japanese drama film directed by Momoko Ando. It was released in Japan on November 8, 2014.

Cast
Sakura Ando as Sawa Yamagishi
Akira Emoto as Takeshi Sasaki
 as Shigeru
Mitsuko Kusabue as Shizue Makabe
Masahiko Tsugawa as Yoshio Makabe
 as Hamada
Miyoko Asada as Hisako
Junkichi Orimoto as Shozo Kataoka
Midori Kiuchi as Yukiko Kataoka
Nozomi Tsuchiya as Makoto Kataoka
 as Yasuo
Masahiro Higashide as Karaoke clerk

Reception

Critical response
Maggie Lee of Variety called the film "a work of both cool precision and endearing eccentricity".

Accolades
At the 36th Yokohama Film Festival, the film was chosen as the 3rd best Japanese film of the year and Momoko Andō won the award for Best Director.

At the 39th Hochi Film Awards, the film won the award for Best Picture and Masahiko Tsugawa won the award for Best Supporting Actor.

At the 69th Mainichi Film Awards, Momoko Andō won the award for Best Screenplay and Sakura Ando won the award for Best Actress.

References

External links
 

2014 drama films
Japanese drama films
Films based on Japanese novels
2010s Japanese films